James Moran (6 March 1935 – 1 January 2020) was a Scottish footballer who scored 52 goals from 190 appearances in the Football League playing as an inside forward for Leicester City, Norwich City, Northampton Town, Darlington and Workington in the 1950s and 1960s. He began his career with Wishaw Juniors, and went on to play English non-league football in the Eastern Counties League for Lowestoft Town. In 1967, he joined Great Yarmouth Town, becoming manager for the 1968–69 season and leading the club to its first league title. He returned to Lowestoft, and later managed Gorleston from 1975 to 1976 and played for Bury Town, before becoming manager of Lowestoft. Moran died at the age of 84 in January 2020.

References

1935 births
2020 deaths
People from Cleland, North Lanarkshire
Scottish footballers
Association football inside forwards
Wishaw Juniors F.C. players
Leicester City F.C. players
Norwich City F.C. players
Northampton Town F.C. players
Darlington F.C. players
Workington A.F.C. players
Lowestoft Town F.C. players
Great Yarmouth Town F.C. players
Gorleston F.C. players
Bury Town F.C. players
Scottish Junior Football Association players
English Football League players
Scottish football managers
Great Yarmouth Town F.C. managers
Gorleston F.C. managers
Lowestoft Town F.C. managers
Footballers from North Lanarkshire